Hampstead is a London Underground station in Hampstead, North London. It is on the Edgware branch of the Northern line, between Golders Green and Belsize Park stations. The branch's northernmost subterranean station, it is on the boundary between Travelcard Zone 2 and Zone 3.

Designed by architect Leslie Green, it was opened on 22 June 1907 by the Charing Cross, Euston & Hampstead Railway. As it is at the junction of Heath Street and Hampstead High Street, the name Heath Street was proposed before opening, and the original tiled signs on the platform walls still read Heath Street. Its high-speed lifts, originally manufactured by Otis, were modernised by the Wadsworth Lift Company, and again in 2014 by Accord.

To the north, between Hampstead and Golders Green stations, is the uncompleted North End or Bull & Bush station. London Overground's Hampstead Heath station on the North London line is a 10–15 minute walk east.

Connections
London Buses routes 46 and 268, schools service 603 and night bus N5 serve the station.

References

External links

  Station exterior, 1925

Northern line stations
Tube stations in the London Borough of Camden
Former Charing Cross, Euston and Hampstead Railway stations
Railway stations in Great Britain opened in 1907
Buildings and structures in Hampstead
Leslie Green railway stations
London Underground Night Tube stations